Holly Springs Sun was  a weekly newspaper based in Fuquay-Varina, North Carolina covering Holly Springs. It closed in 2013.

References

Defunct newspapers published in North Carolina
Mass media in Holly Springs, North Carolina